Akbar Mohammadi may refer to: 
 Akbar Mohammadi (footballer) (born 1975), Iranian retired football player and current football coach
 Akbar Mohammadi (student) (1972–2006), Iranian student pro-democracy protester